Master Miner is a maze shooter for IBM PC compatibles  released as a self-booting disk by Funtastic in 1983. It was written  by Dan Illowsky who previously wrote Snack Attack for the Apple II. The game involves collecting diamonds while avoiding bandits.

References

External links
Gameplay video at YouTube

1983 video games
Funtastic games
Maze games
Single-player video games
Video games developed in the United States